A message is a discrete unit of communication intended by the source for consumption by some recipient or group of recipients.  A message may be delivered by various means, including courier, telegraphy, carrier pigeon and electronic bus.
A message can be the content of a broadcast.  An interactive
exchange of messages forms a conversation.

One example of a message is a press release, which may vary from a brief report or statement released by a public agency to commercial publicity material.

History

Roles in human communication 

In communication between humans, messages can be verbal or nonverbal:
 A verbal message is an exchange of information using words. Examples include face-to-face communication, telephone calls, voicemails, email etc.
 A nonverbal message is communicated through actions or behaviors rather than words, such as conscious or unconscious body language.

In computer science 

There are two main senses of the word "message" in computing:  messages between the human users of computer systems that are delivered by those computer systems, and messages passed between programs or between components of a single program, for their own purposes.

 Instant messaging and emails are examples of computer software designed for delivering human-readable messages in formatted or unformatted text, from one person to another.
 Message passing is a form of communication used in concurrent and parallel computing, object-oriented programming, and  channel communicate, where communication is made by sending messages to recipients. In a related use of this sense of a message, in object-oriented programming language such as main library ["msg" box]Smalltalk or Java, a message is sent to an object, specifying a request for action.

Safety and privacy concerns 
Safety and privacy concerns have been expressed in the computer science industry regarding messages. There have been cases where instant messaging apps were found to present a risk of spyware infection. Text messaging is one of the larger causes of distracted driving, and the act of texting and driving has been made illegal in many states as a result.

See also

References

External links
 
 
 
J
Communication